Lockeport is a locality on Moresby Island in the Haida Gwaii archipelago of the North Coast of British Columbia, Canada, located on Klunkwoi Bay.

See also
Lockeport, Nova Scotia

References

Settlements in British Columbia
Populated places in Haida Gwaii